Fanny Butcher ( Fanny Amanda Butcher; September 13, 1888 – May 11, 1987) was a long time writer and literary critic for the Chicago Tribune newspaper.

Personal life 
Butcher was born on September 13, 1888, in Fredonia, Kansas, to Levi Oliver Butcher (1862–1929) and Hattie May Young (1864–1947). Her family moved to Chicago when she was 3-years-old and she later attended Lewis Institute (now Illinois Institute of Technology) from 1906 to 1908. She graduated from the University of Chicago in 1910. In 1935 Butcher married Richard Drummond Bokum, Jr. (1885–1963), an advertising executive. They had no children.

Career 
She began at the Tribune in 1913 and held various positions including society editor, club editor, crime reporter, fashion editor, women's assistant editor, special correspondent, music assistant critic. In 1923 she became the literary editor and held the position for 40 years until her retirement in 1963.

A cartoon by Helen E. Hokinson of The New Yorker on the back cover of Fanny Butcher's autobiography, Many Lives – One Love, depicts a bookstore clerk in the biography section showing a book to an elderly lady, saying:

From this, one might infer that Fanny Butcher was a household name among bookish Americans in 1940. In 2016, Butcher was inducted into the Chicago Literary Hall of Fame.

See also
Arthur Meeker, Jr.

Resources

Bibliography
  ; ; .

External links
 Fanny Butcher Papers at the Newberry Library
 Hervey Allen Papers, 1831-1965, SC.1952.01, Special Collections Department, University of Pittsburgh
 Bookwomen building Chicago – the Fanny Butcher story Adele Hast, The Caxtonian Web Edition, May 2002. The Caxton Club of Chicago

1888 births
1987 deaths
Chicago Tribune people
American literary critics
Women literary critics
People from Fredonia, Kansas
Women's page journalists
American women critics